Brownsea Island Ferries Ltd is a company that operates ferries to Brownsea Island in Poole Harbour from Poole and Sandbanks. It also operates cruises around Poole Harbour, Bournemouth, Sandbanks, the Jurassic Coast and the Isle of Wight. The vessels operated by the company are the Maid of Poole, Maid of the Harbour, Maid of the Lakelands and Maid of the Islands.

Gallery

References

External links
Brownsea Island Ferries Ltd

Ferry companies of England
Ferry transport in England